Achasan is a hill that sits between the counties of Gwangjin-gu and Guri in South Korea.

As you walk down towards Mt. Achasan from the summit of Yongmasan, you will find the ruins of a small fort of the Goguryeo era (BC37~AD668) built at a strategic point overlooking the area of Jungnangcheon Stream. On the way up, you will find numerous observation platforms from which one can see a great view of some of the landmarks of Seoul such as the Hangang Bridge, Mt. Namsan, 63 City building, and Gangnam COEX.

There is an extensive system of trails on Achasan/Yongsan mountains with numerous entrances. In general, people start their hike from Mt. Yongmasan (용마산) and go down to Mt. Achasan (아차산), or vice versa. Either trail takes about two hours. Some areas are steep, so it is important to wear hiking boots or trekking shoes. At 287 meters high, Mt. Achasan is an easy 30-minute hike, perfect for beginners, allowing many people to walk up the hill wearing casual clothing. It offers hikers a bird's-eye-view of the Hangang River and the downtown area. At the halfway observation deck and the summit, there is a view of the upper stream of the Hangang River and the cities of Guri and Hanam. From Achasan Fort the Han river is visible almost in its entirety as it flows through Seoul). This is the closest vantage point for viewing the Hangang River from above.

See also
List of mountains in Korea

References

External links
 Travel Highlights by Visit Korea, 2012

Gwangjin District
Mountains of Seoul
Mountains of Gyeonggi Province
Guri
Mountains of South Korea